Edward Griffith was an American politician who served in the New York State Assembly from 1973 to 2000.  He represented the constituency consisting of the East New York neighborhood in Brooklyn.
 In 2000, he lost the Democratic primary to his former aide Diane Gordon.

References

Year of birth missing (living people)
Living people
Democratic Party members of the New York State Assembly
Place of birth missing (living people)
Politicians from Brooklyn